Matti Järvinen (born 20 April 1984) is a Finnish former professional ice hockey goaltender who played for Ässät in the SM-liiga during the 2003–04 season.

External links
 

1984 births
Ässät players
Vålerenga Ishockey players
Finnish expatriate ice hockey players in Sweden
Finnish expatriate ice hockey players in Norway
Finnish ice hockey goaltenders
Living people
Manglerud Star Ishockey players
Sportspeople from Pori